The tendency of the rate of profit to fall (TRPF) is a theory in the  crisis theory of political economy, according to which the rate of profit—the ratio of the profit to the amount of invested capital—decreases over time. This hypothesis gained additional prominence from its discussion by Karl Marx in Chapter 13 of Capital, Volume III, but economists as diverse as Adam Smith, John Stuart Mill, David Ricardo and Stanley Jevons referred explicitly to the TRPF as an empirical phenomenon that demanded further theoretical explanation, although they differed on the reasons why the TRPF should necessarily occur.

Geoffrey Hodgson stated that the theory of the TRPF "has been regarded, by most Marxists, as the backbone of revolutionary Marxism. According to this view, its refutation or removal would lead to reformism in theory and practice". Stephen Cullenberg stated that the TRPF "remains one of the most important and highly debated issues of all of economics" because it raises "the fundamental question of whether, as capitalism grows, this very process of growth will undermine its conditions of existence and thereby engender periodic or secular crises."

Causal explanations

Karl Marx 
In Marx's critique of political economy, the value of a commodity is the amount of labour that is socially necessary to produce that commodity. Marx argued that technological innovation enabled more efficient means of production. In the short run, physical productivity would increase as a result, allowing the early adopting capitalists to produce greater use values (i.e., physical output). In the long run, if demand remains the same and the more productive methods are adopted across the entire economy, the amount of labour required (as a ratio to capital, i.e. the organic composition of capital) would decrease. Now, assuming value is tied to the amount of labor necessary, the value of the physical output would decrease relative to the value of production capital invested. In response, the average rate of industrial profit would therefore tend to decline in the longer term.

It declined in the long run, Marx argued, paradoxically not because productivity decreased, but instead because it increased, with the aid of a bigger investment in equipment and materials.

The central idea that Marx had, was that overall technological progress has a long-term "labor-saving bias", and that the overall long-term effect of saving labor time in producing commodities with the aid of more and more machinery had to be a falling rate of profit on production capital, quite regardless of market fluctuations or financial constructions.

Countertendencies 
Marx regarded the TRPF as a general tendency in the development of the capitalist mode of production. Marx maintained that it was only a tendency, and that there are also "counteracting factors" operating which had to be studied as well. The counteracting factors were factors that would normally raise the rate of profit. In his draft manuscript edited by Friedrich Engels, Marx cited six of them:

 More intense exploitation of labor (raising the rate of exploitation of workers).
 Reduction of wages below the value of labor power (the immiseration thesis).
 Cheapening the elements of constant capital by various means.
 The growth of a relative surplus population (the reserve army of labor) which remained unemployed.
 Foreign trade reducing the cost of industrial inputs and consumer goods.
 The increase in the use of share capital by joint-stock companies, which devolves part of the costs of using capital in production on others.

Nevertheless, Marx thought the countervailing tendencies ultimately could not prevent the average rate of profit in industries from falling; the tendency was intrinsic to the capitalist mode of production. In the end, none of the conceivable counteracting factors could stem the tendency toward falling profits from production.

Capital stock growth 
In Adam Smith's TRPF theory, the falling tendency results from the growth of capital which is accompanied by increased competition. The growth of capital stock itself would drive down the average rate of profit.

Other influences 
There could also be several other factors involved in profitability which Marx and others did not discuss in detail, including:

 Reductions in the turnover time of industrial capital generally (and especially fixed capital investment).
 Accelerated depreciation and faster throughput.
 The level of price inflation for different types of goods and services.
 Taxes, levies, subsidies and credit policies of governments, interest and rent costs.
 Capital investment into areas of (previously) non-capitalist production, where a lower organic composition of capital prevailed.
 Military wars or military spending causing capital assets to be inoperative or destroyed, or spurring war production (see permanent arms economy).
 Demographic factors.
 Advances in technology and technological revolutions which rapidly reduce input costs.
 Particularly in the era of globalization, the national and international freight rate (shipping, trucking, railfreight, airfreight).
 Substituted natural resource inputs, or marginal increased cost of non-substituted natural resource inputs.
 Consolidation of mature industries into an oligarchy of survivors. Mature industries do not attract new capital because of low returns. Mature companies with large amounts of capital invested and brand recognition can also try to block new competitors in their markets. See also secular stagnation theory.
 The use of credit instruments to reduce capital costs for new production.

The scholarly controversy about the TRPF among Marxists and non-Marxists has continued for a hundred years. There exist nowadays several thousands of academic publications on the TRPF worldwide. No available book provides an exposition of all the different arguments that have been made. Professor Michael C. Howard  stated that "The connection between profit and economic theory is an intimate one. (...) However, a generally accepted theory of profit has not emerged at any stage in the history of economics... theoretical controversies remain intense."

Dispute over existence

Okishio's theorem 

The Japanese economist Nobuo Okishio notably argued in 1961, "if the newly introduced technique satisfies the cost criterion [i.e. if it reduces unit costs, given current prices] and the rate of real wage remains constant", then the rate of profit must increase.

Assuming constant real wages, technical change would lower the production cost per unit, thereby raising the innovator's rate of profit. The price of output would fall, and this would cause the other capitalists' costs to fall also. The new (equilibrium) rate of profit would therefore have to rise. By implication, the rate of profit could in that case only fall if real wages rose in response to higher productivity, squeezing profits.

This theory is sometimes called neo-Ricardian, because David Ricardo also claimed that a fall in the average rate of profit could ordinarily be brought about only by rising wages (one other scenario could be, that foreign competition would drive down the local market prices for outputs, causing falling profits).

Criticism 
John E. Roemer criticized the absence of fixed capital in Okishio's model, and therefore modified Okishio's model, to include the effect of fixed capital. He concluded though that:It is also possible to construct an alternative Okishio-type model, in which the rising cost of land rents (or property rents) lowers the industrial rate of profit.

Competition 
David Ricardo, interpreting Adam Smith's falling rate of profit theory to be that increased competition drives down the average rate of profit, argued that competition could only level out differences in profit rates on investments in production, but not lower the general profit rate (the grand-average profit rate) as a whole. Apart from a few exceptional cases, Ricardo claimed, the average rate of profit could only fall if wages rose.

In Capital, Karl Marx criticized Ricardo's idea. Marx argued that, instead, the tendency of the rate of profit to fall is "an expression peculiar to the capitalist mode of production of the progressive development of the social productivity of labor". Marx never denied that profits could contingently fall for all kinds of reasons, but he thought there was also a structural reason for the TRPF, regardless of current market fluctuations.

Productivity 
By raising productivity, labor-saving technologies can increase the average industrial rate of profit rather than lowering it, insofar as fewer workers can produce vastly more output at a lower cost, enabling more sales in less time. Ladislaus von Bortkiewicz stated: "Marx’s own proof of his law of the falling rate of profit errs principally in disregarding the mathematical relationship between the productivity of labour and the rate of surplus value." Jürgen Habermas argued in 1973–74 that the TRPF might have existed in 19th century liberal capitalism, but no longer existed in late capitalism, because of the expansion of "reflexive labor" ("labor applied to itself with the aim of increasing the productivity of labor"). Michael Heinrich has also argued that Marx did not adequately demonstrate that the rate of profit would fall when increases in productivity are taken into account.

Contingency 
How exactly the average industrial rate of profit will evolve is either uncertain and unpredictable, or it is historically contingent; it all depends on the specific configuration of costs, sales and profit margins obtainable in fluctuating markets with given technologies. This "indeterminacy" criticism revolves around the idea that technological change could have many different and contradictory effects. It could reduce costs, or it could increase unemployment; it could be labor-saving, or it could be capital-saving. Therefore, so the argument goes, it is impossible to infer definitely a theoretical principle that a falling rate of profit must always and inevitably result from an increase in productivity.

Perhaps the law of the tendency of the rate of profit to fall might be true in an abstract model, based on certain assumptions, but in reality no substantive, long-run empirical predictions can be made[?]. In addition, profitability itself can be influenced by an enormous array of different factors, going far beyond those which Marx specified[?]. So there are tendencies and counter-tendencies operating simultaneously, and no particular empirical result necessarily and always follows from them[?].

Labor theory of value 
Steve Keen argues that if you assume the labor theory of value is wrong, then this obviates the bulk of the critique. Keen suggests that the TRPF was based on the idea that only labor can create new value (following the labor theory of value), and that there was a tendency over time for ratio of capital to labor (in value terms) to rise. If surplus can be produced by all production inputs, then he believes there is no reason why an increase in the ratio of capital to labor inputs should cause the overall rate of surplus to decline.

Eugen Böhm von Bawerk and his critic Ladislaus Bortkiewicz (himself influenced by Vladimir Karpovich Dmitriev) claimed that Marx's argument about the distribution of profits from newly produced surplus value is mathematically faulty. This gave rise to a lengthy academic controversy. Critics claimed that Marx failed to reconcile the law of value with the reality of the distribution of capital and profits, a problem that had already preoccupied David Ricardo – who himself inherited the problem from Adam Smith, yet failed to solve it.

Marx was already aware of this theoretical problem when he wrote The Poverty of Philosophy (1847). It gets a mention again in the Grundrisse (1858). At the end of chapter 1 of his A Contribution to the Critique of Political Economy (1859), he referred to it, and announced his intention to solve it. In Theories of Surplus Value (1862–1863), he discusses the problem very clearly. His first attempt at a solution occurs in a letter to Engels, dated 2 August 1862. In Capital, Volume I (1867) he noted that "many intermediate terms" were still needed in his progressing narrative, to arrive at the answer. Engels suggested, that Marx had indeed solved the problem in the posthumously published Capital, Volume III, but critics alleged Marx never delivered a credible or definitive solution.

Specifically, critics claimed that Marx failed to prove that average labour requirements are the real regulator of product-prices within capitalist production, since Marx failed to demonstrate what exactly the causal or quantitative connection was between the two. As a corollary, Marx's theory of the TRPF was undermined as well, since it was based on a necessary long-term evolution of value-proportions between the composition of production capital and the yield of production capital.

Empirical research

Before 1970 
In the 1870s, Marx certainly wanted to test his theory of economic crises and profit-making econometrically, but adequate macroeconomic statistical data and mathematical tools did not exist to do so. Such scientific resources began to exist only half a century later.

In 1894, Friedrich Engels did mention the research of the émigré socialist Georg Christian Stiebeling, who compared profit, income, capital and output data in the U.S. census reports of 1870 and 1880, but Engels claimed that Stiebeling explained the results "in a completely false way" (Stiebeling's defence against Engels's criticism included two open letters submitted to the New Yorker Volkszeitung and Die Neue Zeit). Stiebeling's analysis represented "almost certainly the first systematic use of statistical sources in Marxian value theory."

Although Eugen Varga and the young Charles Bettelheim; already studied the topic, and Josef Steindl began to tackle the problem in his 1952 book, the first major empirical analysis of long-term trends in profitability inspired by Marx was a 1957 study by Joseph Gillman. This study, reviewed by Ronald L. Meek and H. D. Dickinson, was extensively criticized by Shane Mage in 1963. Mage's work provided the first sophisticated disaggregate analysis of official national accounts data performed by a Marxist scholar.

After 1970 
There have been a number of non-Marxist empirical studies of the long-term trends in business profitability.

Particularly in the late 1970s and early 1980s, there were concerns among non-Marxist economists that the profit rate could be really falling.

Various efforts have been conducted since the 1970s to empirically examine the TRPF. Studies supporting or arguing in favour of it include those by Michael Roberts, Themistoklis Kalogerakos, Marcelo Resende, Minqi Li, John Bradford, and Deenpankar Basu (2012). Studies critical or contradicting the TRPF include those by Òscar Jordà and Simcha Barkai. Other studies, such as those by Basu (2013), Elveren Thomas Weiß and Ivan Trofimov, report mixed results or argue that the answer is not yet certain due to conflicting findings and issues with appropriately measuring the TRPF.

From time to time, the research units of banks and government departments produce studies of profitability in various sectors of industry. The National Statistics Office of Britain now releases company profitability statistics every quarter, showing increasing profits. In the UK, Ernst & Young (EY) nowadays provide a Profit Warning Stress Index for quoted companies. The Share Centre publishes the Profit Watch UK Report. In the US, Yardeni Research provides a briefing on S&P 500 profit margin trends, including comparisons with NIPA data.

See also 
 Crisis theory
Critique of political economy
 Financial crisis
 Internal rate of return
 Steady-state economy: the stationary state in classical economics

References 

Classical economics
Marxian economics